Ilario Antoniazzi (born April 23, 1948, in Rai (San Polo di Piave), Province of Treviso) has been the archbishop of the Archdiocese of Tunis since February 21, 2013.

Biography
Born in Rai, frazione of San Polo di Piave in 1948, in 1962 he entered the Seminary of Jerusalem and in 1972 he was ordained as a priest.

For many years he was pastor in various parishes of the patriarchy, and since 2011 has also served as director of the 44 Catholic schools in the patriarchy.

On February 21, 2013 Pope Benedict XVI appointed him as archbishop of the Archdiocese of Tunis. He was ordained on March 16 and installed on April 7.

He speaks Italian and French, but is fluent also in Arabic and English.

Motto
TURRIS FORTISSIMA NOMEN DOMINI (The name of the Lord is the strongest tower)

References

External links

Profile of Mons. Antoniazzi www.catholic-hierarchy.org

1948 births
Living people
Italian Roman Catholic archbishops
Italian Roman Catholic bishops in Africa
20th-century Italian Roman Catholic bishops
Roman Catholic archbishops of Tunis